Joel Steed (born February 17, 1969) is a former American football nose tackle who played eight seasons for the Pittsburgh Steelers. He went to the University of Colorado at Boulder.

Steed was drafted by the Pittsburgh Steelers in the 3rd round of the 1992 NFL Draft. Steed quickly started at nose tackle and was a starter for the team throughout the 1990s.

References 

1969 births
Living people
American football defensive tackles
Colorado Buffaloes football players
Pittsburgh Steelers players
American Conference Pro Bowl players